A Heart in Winter is a French film which was released in 1992. It stars Emmanuelle Béart, Daniel Auteuil and André Dussollier.  It was chosen to compete at the 49th Venice International Film Festival, where it won four awards, tying for the Silver Lion. It was nominated for Best Foreign Film at the 1994 BAFTA awards.

The romantic drama was the second-to-last film made by French writer/director Claude Sautet. He worked with Béart again on his final feature, 1995's Nelly and Mr. Arnaud (original title Nelly et Monsieur Arnaud).

Plot
Highly regarded violin restorer Stéphane works and plays squash with his longtime business partner Maxime. After Maxime, who is married, begins a relationship with concert violinist Camille, Stéphane is called in to do some urgent repairs on Camille's violin. Camille begins to fall for Stéphane, and reveals the truth to Maxime. Stéphane's cool reaction causes confusion for Camille, and she lashes out at him for denying his feelings.

Cast
 Emmanuelle Béart – Camille
 Daniel Auteuil – Stéphane
 André Dussollier – Maxime
 Élizabeth Bourgine – Hélène
 Brigitte Catillon – Regine
 Myriam Boyer – Mme. Amet
 Maurice Garrel – Lachaume
 Jean-Luc Bideau – Ostende

Music
The film features a number of performances of chamber music by Maurice Ravel, played by Jean-Jacques Kantorow (violin), Howard Shelley (piano) and Keith Harvey (cello).  New Zealand musician Jeffrey Grice appears in the film in the role of the pianist.

The film contains only excerpts of Ravel compositions, but the soundtrack album includes them in their entirety, performed by Jean-Jacques Kantorow (violin), Philippe Muller (cello) and Jacques Rouvier (piano). A fourth Ravel composition not excerpted in the film, Berceuse sur le nom de Gabriel Faure, is on the soundtrack album. The film helped further popularise Ravel's Piano Trio. The track listing:

 Trio Pour Piano, Violon Et Violoncelle
 i. Premier Mouvement
 ii. Pantoum
 iii. Passacaille
 iv. Final
 Sonata Pour Violon Et Violoncelle
 i. Allegro
 ii. Très Vif
 iii. Vif, Avec Entrain
 Sonate Pour Violon Et Piano
 i. Premier Mouvement
 ii. Blues
 iii. Perpetuum Mobile
 Berceuse Sur Le Nom De Gabriel Fauré

Production notes 

Emmanuelle Béart practised violin for at least a year before the film began shooting, so that she could convincingly mime the performance sequences.

Béart and Auteuil were in a relationship, and married during the making of this film.

Claude Sautet based it on his memories of reading Mikhail Lermontov's "Princess Mary".

Reception 
On Rotten Tomatoes the film has an approval rating of 85% based on reviews from 13 critics.

Roger Ebert of the Chicago Sun-Times gave the film 3.5 out of 4, and wrote: "Un Coeur en Hiver, directed by Claude Sautet, has the intensity and delicacy of a great short story."

References

External links 
 
 
 A Heart in Winter  Philosophical Films

1992 films
1992 romantic drama films
French romantic drama films
1990s French-language films
Films about violins and violinists
Films about classical music and musicians
1990s buddy films
Films directed by Claude Sautet
Films whose director won the Best Director César Award
Films featuring a Best Supporting Actor César Award-winning performance
1990s French films